The Faculty of Roman-Catholic Theology is one of the seven faculties of the University of Tübingen located in Tübingen, Baden-Württemberg in Germany. In 1812 the Faculty was founded as University of Ellwangen. The newly founded university was dissolved in 1817 and incorporated as a Faculty into the University of Tübingen.

History 
Frederick I, Duke of Württemberg determined Ellwangen to be the site of a new Roman-Catholic diocese, after the Bishopric of Constance had been dissolved in the course of German Mediatisation and the Ellwangen Prince-Provostry had been secularized. Hence a seminary, a diocesan chancery and Friedrich's University were founded in Ellwangen in 1812. After Fredericks death in 1816, his successor William I, King of Württemberg discarded the establishment of a Roman-Catholic diocese in Ellwangen, and decided Rottenburg to be the site of the new Roman-Catholic diocese. Therefore, the University of Ellwangen was closed and incorporated as a Faculty into the University of Tübingen in 1817.

Rottenburg had been an exclave of Austria for more than 400 years, until it became part of Württemberg by the Treaty of Pressburg in 1805. When Rottenburg became a part of Württemberg, it was the town with the highest Roman-Catholic population. While the Reformation succeeded in Württemberg and Tübingen became Protestant Rottenburg remained Catholic. The diocesan chancery was moved from Ellwangen to Rottenburg in 1817. In the same year a seminary was founded in Rottenburg. In 1821 the Roman Catholic Diocese of Rottenburg was founded by Papal Bull De salute animarum. As a part of the foundation of the Faculty of Roman-Catholic Theology, a hall of residence for theology students had to established. Therefore, the Wilhelmsstift was founded in 1817. It took the building of the former Collegium illustre.

Since its foundation in 1817, the Faculty of Roman-Catholic Theology gave rise to a number of important Catholic theologians. Among these were Johann Sebastian von Drey and Johann Adam Möhler, who founded the Catholic School of Tübingen, and Johann Baptist von Hirscher, who as a teacher of the School of Tübingen had great influence in the domain of moral theology. Famous professors of the faculty were Joseph Ratzinger (later Pope Benedikt XVI) and Hans Küng, who was withdrawn of canonical mission because of his rejection of the doctrine of papal infallibility.

References 

University of Tübingen
Tübingen
Universities and colleges in Baden-Württemberg
Catholic universities and colleges in Germany